Tselinny is a rural locality (a selo) and the administrative center of Novotselinny Selsoviet, Klyuchevsky District, Altai Krai, Russia. The population was 1,189 as of 2013. There are 15 streets.

Geography 
Tselinny is located 6 km east of Klyuchi (the district's administrative centre) by road. Klyuchi is the nearest rural locality.

References 

Rural localities in Klyuchevsky District